Havanirooz 1st Combat Base ( – Pādegān-e Havānīrūz) is a military installation in Dorudfaraman Rural District, in the Central District of Kermanshah County, Kermanshah Province, Iran. At the 2006 census, its population was 2,069, in 539 families.

References 

Populated places in Kermanshah County
Islamic Republic of Iran Army Aviation Bases